Valentino Mapapalangi (born 18 July 1993) is a Tongan rugby union player. He plays in the number 8 and blind side position. He previously played for the England based Premiership Rugby side, Leicester Tigers. Mapapalangi also represents Tonga at international level.

Early career

Mapapalangi was educated in Auckland, he attended Kelston Boys High School and Liston College both in West Auckland before attending Sacred Heart College in his final year.

Club career
After spending time with the  development squad in the early part of the year, Mapapalangi made the Manawatu squad ahead of the 2015 ITM Cup season and scored 3 tries in 9 appearances during the campaign.   His performances attracted the attention of Super Rugby franchise, the  who invited him to train with their wider training group during the 2016 Super Rugby pre-season.

The 2016 Mitre 10 Cup was less successful for both Mapapalangi and his side.   The Turbos finished 5th in the Championship table while he made 7 appearances of which only 2 came from the start.

On 7 August 2017 Mapapalangi signed for Leicester Tigers in the Aviva Premiership. He made an impressive debut for Leicester on 16 September 2017 as a replacement for Joe Maksymiw in a 24-10 win against Gloucester at Welford Road.  His first start came the next month in a 28-17 victory against London Irish at the Madejski Stadium.   On 15 May 2019 he was announced as one of the players to leave Leicester following the end of the 2018-19 Premiership Rugby season.

International career

References

External links 
 
 

1993 births
Living people
New Zealand rugby union players
Tonga international rugby union players
Rugby union flankers
Rugby union locks
Rugby union number eights
Manawatu rugby union players
People educated at Sacred Heart College, Auckland
People educated at Liston College
Leicester Tigers players